Hlai may refer to:

 Hlai people, an ethnic group of China
 Hlai languages, a group of Tai-Kadai languages

See also 
 Hlay
 , a hamlet in Valozhyn District, Belarus